Acacia desmondii, also known as Des Nelson wattle is a shrub belonging to the genus Acacia and the subgenus Juliflorae that is native to central Australia. It is listed a vulnerable.

Description
It has fibrous grey coloured bark on the lower part of the trunk which becomes red-grey minni ritchi style bark further up and on the main branches. The terete and glabrous branchlets have obscure ridges. Like most species of Acacia it has phyllodes rather than true leaves. The linear evergreen phyllodes taper towards the base and are infrequently curved towards the apex. It blooms between July and November producing golden flowers.

Taxonomy
The specific epithet honours Des Nelson, a botanist who lived in Alice Springs, and the first to collect the species in 1964. This species was originally described as Acacia nelsonii by Maslin in 1980, however, the name had been previously used by William Safford in 1914 for a Mexican species.

Distribution
It is endemic to a small area among the plains and hills of the Rodinga Range, Train Hills and Pillar Range on Allambi Station and Todd River Station in the southern part of the Northern Territory to the south of Alice Springs where it is often situated along stony watercourses and in dry rocky gullies at the foot of the ranges and on rocky cliffs composed of sandstone.

See also
List of Acacia species

References

desmondii
Flora of the Northern Territory
Taxa named by Bruce Maslin
Plants described in 1987